Tímea Babos was the defending champion, but chose not to participate.

Evgeniya Rodina won the title, defeating Chang Kai-chen in the final, 6–4, 6–3.

Seeds

Main draw

Finals

Top half

Bottom half

References 
 Main draw

OEC Taipei WTA Challenger - Singles
Taipei WTA Ladies Open